Ray Turner may refer to:
 Ray Turner (computer scientist) (born 1947), English computer scientist
 Ray Turner (artist) (born 1958), American artist
 Ray Turner (basketball) (born 1990), American basketball player
Ray Turner (pianist) (1903–1976), American pianist